Giuseppe Doldi (born March 19, 1950 in Crema) is a retired Italian professional football player.

External links

1950 births
Living people
Italian footballers
Serie A players
Atalanta B.C. players
Inter Milan players
Calcio Foggia 1920 players
U.S. Livorno 1915 players
A.S.D. Gallipoli Football 1909 players
U.S. Pergolettese 1932 players
U.S. 1913 Seregno Calcio players
Association football midfielders